Indore is a major city in Madhya Pradesh, India.

Indore may also refer to:
 topics associated with the city:
 Indore district, the district
 Indore division, the larger administrative unit
 Indore State, the former princely state
 Indore Residency, a residency of British India
 Indore, West Virginia, a place in the United States

See also 
 Indori (disambiguation)
 Indoor (disambiguation)
 Indur